Gary Owen (born 1929 in Tumble, Carmarthenshire, Wales; died 1995 in Brisbane, Australia) was a Welsh–born Australian snooker player.

Career
Owen was the inaugural British Under-16 champion in 1944 and reached the final of the prestigious English Amateur Championship six years later. He then gave up competitive play for a number of years, returning only in the early 1960s.

In 1963 he matched the achievement of his brother Marcus, winning the English Amateur Championship. This qualified him to compete for England at the inaugural World Amateur Championship in Calcutta that year. He won all his matches in a round-robin format and took the title. He became world amateur champion for a second time in 1966, beating future world professional champion John Spencer who was the runner-up.

In 1968 Owen, Spencer and Ray Reardon become the first players in a generation to turn professional. His best performance as a professional came in 1969 when he reached the final of the reconstituted World Professional Snooker Championship, losing to old rival Spencer by 37 frames to 24. A semi-finalist in 1970, he was defeated in the last eight in 1973 and 1975. In 1970 Owen defeated Ray Reardon 6–4 in the final of the Stratford Professional.

Owen emigrated to Australia, taking a job as the resident professional at a snooker club in Sydney, and was runner-up to Eddie Charlton in the 1972 and 1973 Australian Professional championships.  After gaining Australian citizenship, he represented his new country at the Snooker World Cup in 1979.

Performance and rankings timeline

Career finals

Non-ranking finals: 5 (2 titles)

Amateur finals: 4 (3 titles)

Notes

References

1929 births
1995 deaths
Welsh snooker players
Sportspeople from Carmarthenshire